Yar Qoli Beyg (also Romanized as Yār Qolī Beyg; also known as Yārqolī Bak and Yār Qolī Reyg) is a village in Chahar Gonbad Rural District, in the Central District of Sirjan County, Kerman Province, Iran. At the 2006 census, its population was 45, in 13 families.

References 

Populated places in Sirjan County